Fleet Air Reconnaissance Squadron 6 (VQ-6) was a former squadron of the U.S. Navy's Atlantic Fleet. During its short-lived career, it was the second of two squadrons to operate the ES-3A Shadow, an ELINT version of the Lockheed S-3 Viking.

History

Early Years 

VQ-6 was founded on August 5, 1991 at NAS Cecil Field in Jacksonville, Florida. This was after the only carrier capable ELINT aircraft at the time, the EA-3B Skywarrior, was retired from service by VQ-2. After VQ-5 received the ES-3A in May 1992, VQ-6 became the second to receive the aircraft on August 19, 1992. A year later between April 13, 1993 and May 18, 1993, the squadron participated in workup trials on the USS America CV-66.

VQ-6 Detachment A made their first deployment on the USS Saratoga CV-60 between January 12 and June 24, 1994 as part of Carrier Air Wing 17 (CVW-17). This would be the only deployment they would make on the carrier. During their thirteen deployments, they participated in Operation Southern Watch as well as NATO operations in Bosnia from the USS Theodore Roosevelt CVN-71 and the America. Other Carriers that VQ-6 deployed onboard included USS Washington CVN-73 (including its maiden cruise in 1994) as part of CVW-7 and CVW-1, USS Dwight D. Eisenhower CVN-69 as part of CVW-3, USS John F. Kennedy CV-67 with CVW-8 and the USS John C. Stennis CVN-74 during a world cruise with CVW-7 in 1998. During workups for that cruise in October 1997, the squadron along with the Stennis was featured in an episode of the Discovery Channel documentary series Extreme Machines.

Final Years 

During their last deployment, the squadron made their last deployment as Detachment A on the USS Enterprise CVN-65 as part of CVW-3, taking part in the strikes conducted in Operation Desert Fox.

On August 10, 1999, the last ES-3A were sent to AMARC at Davis-Monthan AFB in Arizona. After this, on the 26th, a ceremony was held before the squadron was finally decommissioned on September 30, 1999.

See also 

 VQ-5 Sea Shadows
 ES-3A Sea Shadow

References 

Fleet air reconnaissance squadrons of the United States Navy
United States Navy
Squadrons of the United States
Military units and formations disestablished in 1999